The Cavendish College London (CCL), also sometimes known as Cavendish College, is the trading name belonging to Cavendish International Education. It provides courses in computing, creative studies, digital media, business, hospitality and music.

History
The college was established in 1985. In 2004, Cavendish expanded its operations in Africa and opened a university in Zambia (Cavendish University Zambia) after four years of successful operation in Zambia, the brand expanded to Uganda and opened its second university in 2008 (Cavendish University Uganda) and has since established other colleges internationally.

References

External links
Cavendish University Uganda (CUU)
Cavendish University Zambia (CUZ)

Educational institutions established in 1985
Education in London
Higher education colleges in London
Defunct universities and colleges in London
1985 establishments in England